Fabrice Olinga Essono (born 12 May 1996), known as Olinga, is a Cameroonian footballer who plays as a forward.

He became the youngest ever player to score in La Liga at the age of 16, at the service of Málaga. Released shortly after, he went on to compete professionally in Belgium, Cyprus, Romania and Portugal.

Olinga represented Cameroon at the 2014 World Cup.

Early years
Born in Douala, Olinga started learning football in the "Samuel Eto'o Foundation" in Cameroon. He arrived in Spain in 2009, joining the youth ranks of RCD Mallorca.

Two years later, Olinga was spotted by Málaga CF's academy director, Manuel Casanova, who invited him to join the club. He played a crucial part in the Andalusians' side that reached the final of Copa del Rey Juvenil de Fútbol in 2012; however, he himself missed the decisive game against RCD Espanyol (1–0 loss) due to suspension.

Club career
At the age of only 16, Olinga was called up by first-team manager Manuel Pellegrini for the 2012–13 opener, away against RC Celta de Vigo: he came on as a 60th-minute substitute for Sebastián Fernández, and went on to score the game's only goal, becoming La Liga's youngest ever goalscorer at 16 years and 98 days, beating the previous record holder Iker Muniain by 191 days.

Olinga started again four days later, appearing in a 2–0 win over Panathinaikos FC in that season's UEFA Champions League and playing 70 minutes. On 20 January 2014, he cut ties with Málaga – after rejecting the offer for a revised and improved contract counseled by his agent Pini Zahavi– and joined Apollon Limassol FC from the Cypriot First Division, being immediately loaned to S.V. Zulte Waregem for five months with an option to make the move permanently afterwards.

In February 2015, Apollon loaned Olinga to Romania's FC Viitorul Constanța, with the transfer being superseded by U.C. Sampdoria who had too many non-European Union players in its ranks. On 11 April of the following year, his compatriot Eto'o called a press conference in which he announced he was taking the Italian club to court for what he perceived as an unfair treatment of Olinga, going as far as claiming both signings were related.

In the summer of 2015, Sampdoria renounced his rights on Olinga and he signed a two-year deal at Royal Mouscron-Péruwelz. He hardly got a game during his early stint in the Belgian First Division A, his second goal as a professional only arriving on 30 September 2017 in a 2–2 home draw against KV Mechelen.

International career
On 2 October 2012, Olinga was called by the Cameroon national team for a 2013 Africa Cup of Nations qualification match against Cape Verde, and he scored on his debut on the 14th (2–1 win). He was selected by coach Volker Finke for his 2014 FIFA World Cup squad at the age of 18, being the youngest player in the competition but remaining an unused member as the tournament ended in group stage exit.

International goals
 (Cameroon score listed first, score column indicates score after each Olinga goal)

References

External links
Málaga official profile

1996 births
Living people
Cameroonian footballers
Footballers from Douala
Association football forwards
La Liga players
Tercera División players
Atlético Malagueño players
Málaga CF players
Belgian Pro League players
S.V. Zulte Waregem players
Royal Excel Mouscron players
Cypriot First Division players
Apollon Limassol FC players
FC Viitorul Constanța players
Liga Portugal 2 players
Rio Ave F.C. players
Cameroon international footballers
2014 FIFA World Cup players
Cameroonian expatriate footballers
Expatriate footballers in Spain
Expatriate footballers in Belgium
Expatriate footballers in Cyprus
Expatriate footballers in Romania
Expatriate footballers in Portugal
Cameroonian expatriate sportspeople in Spain
Cameroonian expatriate sportspeople in Belgium
Cameroonian expatriate sportspeople in Cyprus
Cameroonian expatriate sportspeople in Romania
Cameroonian expatriate sportspeople in Portugal